Tiffany Majette (born February 8, 1997), known professionally as Orion Sun, is an American singer-songwriter, multi-instrumentalist, and producer based in Philadelphia.

Early life 
Tiffany Majette was born and raised in Mount Laurel, New Jersey in a conservative Christian home. At an early age she was inspired by the music at the Bethany Baptist Church.

Career 
In Philadelphia, Majette became involved in an underground music collective called The Forest, until the death of a member caused the collective to disband.

Majette posted her first song, "Voicemail," to YouTube in 2013. She released the mixtape A Collection of Fleeting Moments and Daydreams in 2020. In 2018, she released singles S T R E T C H and Nirvanaaa. Her debut LP, Hold Space for Me, was released in 2018 with Mom + Pop. In his review for Pitchfork, the critic Dani Blum wrote that the album was "stark [and] lightly poetic".

In 2020, after being injured by police at a racial justice protest in her hometown, Majette wrote the song "Mama's Baby." She raised over $18,000 from the song's sales on Bandcamp, and donated the funds to Breonna Taylor's GoFundMe and the Loveland Foundation.

Personal life 
Majette was kicked out of her home due to her sexuality. She later settled in Philadelphia. Majette identifies as a queer black woman.

References

External links
 

Year of birth missing (living people)
Living people
Musicians from Philadelphia
21st-century American women singers
21st-century American singers
People from Mount Laurel, New Jersey
LGBT people from Pennsylvania
American LGBT singers
Mom + Pop Music artists
African-American women singer-songwriters
LGBT African Americans
Queer musicians
Queer women
American women record producers
Record producers from Pennsylvania
African-American record producers
21st-century African-American women singers
Singer-songwriters from Pennsylvania